René Couanau (born 10 July 1936) was a member of the National Assembly of France between 1988 and 2012.  He represented the Ille-et-Vilaine department,  and was a member of the Union for a Popular Movement.

Since 1989, he was mayor of Saint-Malo, the second largest city in Ille-et-Vilaine, but was defeated 30 March 2014 by his former deputy major Claude Renoult.

References

1936 births
Living people
Knights of the Ordre national du Mérite
Union for a Popular Movement politicians
Deputies of the 12th National Assembly of the French Fifth Republic
Deputies of the 13th National Assembly of the French Fifth Republic